John Pitman may refer to:

 John Pitman (judge) (1785–1864), United States federal judge
 John Pitman (journalist) (1939–2018), British reporter and interviewer
 John Pitman (tennis), player in the 1933 U.S. National Championships - Men's Singles
 John A. Pittman (1928–1995), U.S. soldier
 John Rogers Pitman (1782–1861), English clergyman and author

See also
 John (given name)
 Pitman (disambiguation)